Emidio Cavigioli (3 July 1925 – 23 February 2015) was an Italian professional footballer who played as a forward.

Club career
Cavigioli played for 6 seasons (65 games, 13 goals) in the Italian Serie A for Aurora Pro Patria 1919 and A.C. Torino.

International career
Cavigioli made his international debut for the Italy national football team in 1948 Summer Olympics, on 2 August 1948, in his nation's match against the United States, scoring two goals on his debut.

References

External links

 

1925 births
2015 deaths
Italian footballers
Italy international footballers
Serie A players
Olympic footballers of Italy
Footballers at the 1948 Summer Olympics
Novara F.C. players
Aurora Pro Patria 1919 players
Torino F.C. players
Association football forwards